The 1878–79 Welsh Cup was the second season of the Welsh Cup. The cup was won by Newtown White Star who defeated Wrexham 1–0 in the final.

First round

Source: Welsh Football Data Archive

Replay

Source: Welsh Football Data Archive

Oswestry receive a bye to the next round

Second round

Source: Welsh Football Data Archive

Newtown receive bye into next round

Third round

Source: Welsh Football Data Archive

Replay

Source: Welsh Football Data Archive

Wrexham receive bye to next round

Semi-final

Source: Welsh Football Data Archive

Replay

Source: Welsh Football Data Archive

Final

References

 The History of the Welsh Cup 1877-1993 by Ian Garland (1991) 
 Welsh Football Data Archive

1878-79
Wel
Welsh Cup